Railway transport is the principal means of transportation in China, with over 1.2 billion railway trips taken each year. The following is a list of railway stations in Zhejiang (浙江) Province, China. The top 20 stations (ordered by the number of trains passing through the station) are marked in the "Notes" column.

References

External links
Official web site of China Railway Timetable 全国铁路时刻网 (in Chinese)

Rail transport in Zhejiang
Zhejiang